Psammophis brevirostris, also known as the short-snouted grass snake, is a diurnal, mildly venomous snake native to southern Africa. It is oviparous and can lay up to 15 eggs in summer. The snake feeds on lizards, rodents, snakes and small birds; it is alert and considered fast.

References

Psammophis
Snakes of Africa
Reptiles of Botswana
Reptiles of Eswatini
Reptiles of Namibia
Reptiles of South Africa
Reptiles of Zimbabwe
Reptiles described in 1881
Taxa named by Wilhelm Peters